Stockpoort is a border crossing between South Africa and Botswana in the Limpopo province. On the Botswana side the post is known as Parr's Halt. The Limpopo River separates the border posts.

References

Border crossings of South Africa
Border crossings of Botswana